Robert John Benson (May 18, 1894 – September 7, 1965) was an Icelandic-Canadian ice hockey player. A defenceman, he started his career with the Winnipeg Falcons of the Manitoba Hockey League in 1913, remaining with them until 1920, though missed two seasons of play from 1917 to 1919 while serving in the First World War. With the Falcons he played at the 1920 Summer Olympics and won the first gold medal in Olympic ice hockey. He later played in the Western Canada Hockey League from 1921 to 1926, as well as 8 games with the Boston Bruins of the National Hockey League during the 1924–25 season. Benson continued playing in other minor leagues until retiring in 1931.

Playing career
Benson was born in Davidson, Saskatchewan, to Icelandic immigrants Benedikt Jóhannesson and Rósa Guðmundsdóttir.

He was the younger brother of ice hockey player Connie Benson.

During the 1920–21 season, Canadian Amateur Hockey Association president H. J. Sterling hired a detective who discovered that Benson and teammate Haldor Halderson received C$6,500 to play amateur hockey. The Amateur Athletic Union of Canada voided Halderson's registration card and he was suspended from the 1921 Allan Cup playoffs, although the Saskatchewan Amateur Hockey Association allowed him and his Saskatoon team to continue in the league playoffs.

Career statistics

Regular season and playoffs

International

Awards and achievements
Allan Cup Championship (1920)
Olympic Gold Medalist (1920)

References

External links
 
 
 Falcons

1894 births
1965 deaths
Boston Bruins players
Calgary Tigers players
Canadian ice hockey defencemen
Canadian people of Icelandic descent
Edmonton Eskimos (ice hockey) players
Ice hockey people from Saskatchewan
Ice hockey players at the 1920 Summer Olympics
Medalists at the 1920 Summer Olympics
Minneapolis Millers (AHA) players
Olympic gold medalists for Canada
Olympic ice hockey players of Canada
Olympic medalists in ice hockey
Saskatoon Sheiks players
Seattle Eskimos players
Winnipeg Falcons players
Winnipeg Maroons players